Janků  is a gender-neutral Czech surname that may refer to:

 Hana Janků (1940-1995), Czech soprano
 Heidi Janků (1962), Czech actress
 Jan Janků (1971), Czech former high jumper
 Pavel Janků (1969), Czech professional ice hockey player
 Tomáš Janků (1974), Czech former high jumper

Czech-language surnames